The 1992 Mercantile Credit Classic was the thirteenth and final edition of the professional snooker tournament which took place from 1–11 January 1992 with ITV coverage beginning on the 4th. It was played again at the Bournemouth International Centre in Dorset.

Steve Davis won his sixth Classic title beating Stephen Hendry who was in the final for the second year running in a final frame decider and his first ranking title since the 1989 Grand Prix.


Main draw

Final

Century breaks
(Including qualifying rounds)

142  Antony Bolsover
142, 111  Lee Grant
140, 139, 131, 112, 108  Stephen Hendry
132  Bill Oliver
130  Troy Shaw
128  Terry Griffiths
128  Alan McManus
126  Silvino Francisco
125  Nick Dyson
125  Oliver King
124  Dene O'Kane
122  Steve Russell
120  Micky Wareham
118  Bradley Jones
114, 104, 102  Paul Cavney
114  Paul McPhillips
114  Jimmy White
113  Anthony Hamilton
113  James Wattana
112  Stephen Murphy
112  John Rees
111  Leigh Griffin
111  Jamie Woodman
107  Euan Henderson
104  Sean Lanigan
104, 100  Steve Mifsud
104  Jim Wych
103  Brian Cakebread
102  Karl Broughton
102  Gary Lees
101  Dave Harold
101  Stefan Mazrocis
100  David Langton
100  Willie Thorne

References

Classic (snooker)
Classic
Classic
Classic
Sport in Bournemouth